RSTS can refer to:

 RSTS/E, Resource Sharing Timesharing System Extended
 Range Safety and Telemetry System
 Rubinstein–Taybi syndrome